Pagachi-ye Mambini (also Romanized as Pāgachī-ye Mambīnī) is a village in Howmeh-ye Sharqi Rural District, in the Central District of Ramhormoz County, Khuzestan Province, Iran. At the 2006 census, its population was 1,806, in 353 families.

References 

Populated places in Ramhormoz County